In physics, precisely in the general theory of relativity, post-Minkowskian expansions (PM) or post-Minkowskian approximations are mathematical methods used to find approximate solutions of Einstein's equations by means of a power series development of the metric tensor.

Unlike post-Newtonian expansions (PN), in which the series development is based on a combination of powers of the velocity (which must be negligible compared to that of light) and the gravitational constant, in the post-Minkowskian case the developments are based only on the gravitational constant, allowing analysis even at velocities close to that of light (relativistic).

One of the earliest works on this method of resolution is that of Bruno Bertotti, published in Nuovo Cimento in 1956.

References

General relativity